An All Dogs Christmas Carol is a 1998 direct-to-video animated musical television special based on the 1843 novella A Christmas Carol by Charles Dickens. The final installment in the All Dogs Go to Heaven film series, it also serves as the series finale to the animated series. Unlike the first two films, where the main characters are Charlie and Itchy, Carface is the focus of the story.

Plot 
A bunch of angel puppies ask the whippet Annabelle to tell them a story. She begins to tell them about how Carface saved Christmas with a little guidance from Charlie and Itchy.

In a San Francisco alleyway, Charlie, Itchy and Sasha help their friends decorate for a Christmas party. Charlie and Itchy tend to the young puppies, primarily a little one named Timmy, who has a bad leg. The dogs have a collection for an operation for Timmy. To disrupt the festivities, Carface and Killer arrive for debts. However, as his is not yet due, Charlie refuses. Carface blows a mysterious dog whistle that hypnotizes everyone into give up their bones. As they depart, Carface and Killer take the food, presents and money, including that for Timmy's medical bills.

Charlie and Itchy's attempts to reclaim their goods fail but they discover Carface is working for Annabelle's evil cousin, Belladonna, who plots to use a massive dog whistle to hypnotize every dog in the city into stealing the masters' Christmas presents, causing them to be thrown out of their houses and abandoned by their owners, much in the same way Carface used to be when he was a puppy. Charlie plots to scare "the Dickens" out of him and asks Annabelle for some aid, resulting in them being transformed into characters from A Christmas Carol. Itchy becomes the Ghost of Christmas Past, Sasha the Ghost of Christmas Present, and Charlie the Ghost of Christmas Future.

They each visit Carface, and gradually learn how he turned into a hoodlum. At Itchy's insistence, Carface reveals that he was a happy puppy but his owner blamed him for making a mess of Christmas decorations, which gets him thrown out. Sasha tells him that without the money, Timmy will die, which will cause another — his own. Finally, Charlie shows that because of his actions, Carface will cause his own death, and be condemned to Hell for eternity.

Carface, having seen himself in Timmy, hurries to stop the whistle. Betrayed, Belladonna flies into a frenzied rage and is about to kill Carface and Killer when she is frozen solid by a massive amount of snow caused by Annabelle. As it begins to snow, everyone celebrates, but Itchy laments the lack of presents. At that moment, Carface arrives on a sled pulled by Killer and returns everything, and gives more. Handing back Timmy's money box, it is full to the top. Carface turns to leave but Sasha invites him to stay. He respectfully declines, deciding to visit his mother, but wishes everyone a Merry Christmas.

Cast 
 Ernest Borgnine as Carface Caruthers, the pit bull/bulldog mix (Ebenezer Scrooge)
 Steven Weber as Charles "Charlie" B. Barkin, the German Shepherd, Sasha's husband / Ghost of Christmas Future.
 Dom DeLuise as Itchiford "Itchy Itchiford" Dachshund (the dachshund), Charlie's best friend / Ghost of Christmas Past. 
 Sheena Easton as Sasha la Fleur Barkin (the Irish Setter), Charlie's wife / Ghost of Christmas Present.  
 Charles Nelson Reilly as Killer the schnoodle, Carface's misnamed, neurotic henchdog
 Bebe Neuwirth as Annabelle, an angelic whippet who welcomes dogs into Heaven / Belladonna, Annabelle's demonic cousin
 Beth Anderson as Martha, a young girl and Timmy's owner
 Taylor Emerson as Timmy, a crippled puppy and Martha's pet

Additional voices by Carlos Alazraqui, Dee Bradley Baker, Myles Jeffrey, Megan Malanga, Chris Marquette, Gail Matthius, Aria Noelle Curzon, Ashley Tisdale and Jamie Cronin with singing voices provided by Beth Anderson, Amick Byram, Billy Bodine, Susan Boyd, Alvin Chea, Randy Crenshaw, Lorraine Feather, Edie Lehman, Laurie Shillinger, Carmen Twillie and Vanessa Vandergriff.

Music 
Four original songs by Mark Watters and Lorraine Feather are featured:
 "When We Hear a Christmas Carol" – Charlie, Sasha, Itchy and Ensemble
 "Puppyhood" – Carface and Ensemble
 "I Always Get Emotional at Christmas Time" – Killer and Belladonna
 "Clean Up Your Act" – Charlie and Heavenly Ensemble

See also 
 Adaptations of A Christmas Carol
 List of Christmas films
 List of films about angels

References

External links 

 

All Dogs Go to Heaven
1998 animated films
1998 films
1998 direct-to-video films
1990s American animated films
1990s buddy comedy films
1990s Christmas comedy films
1990s musical comedy films
1990s musical films
American buddy comedy films
American children's animated comedy films
American children's animated musical films
American Christmas films
American sequel films
American television series finales
American musical comedy films
American musical fantasy films
Animated buddy films
Animated Christmas films
Animated films about dogs
Animated films based on novels
Christmas television specials
Direct-to-video sequel films
1990s English-language films
Films based on A Christmas Carol
Television shows based on A Christmas Carol
Films set in San Francisco
Metro-Goldwyn-Mayer animated films
Metro-Goldwyn-Mayer direct-to-video films
Films scored by Mark Watters
Films with screenplays by Jymn Magon
1990s Christmas films
American Christmas comedy films
1998 directorial debut films
1998 comedy films
1990s children's animated films
Metro-Goldwyn-Mayer Animation films
Films directed by Paul Sabella